In geometry, a truncated tetrahedral prism is a convex uniform polychoron (four-dimensional polytope). This polychoron has 10 polyhedral cells: 2 truncated tetrahedra connected by 4 triangular prisms and 4 hexagonal prisms. It has 24 faces: 8 triangular, 18 square, and 8 hexagons. It has 48 edges and 24 vertices.

It is one of 18 uniform polyhedral prisms created by using uniform prisms to connect pairs of parallel Platonic solids and Archimedean solids.

Net

Alternative names
 Truncated-tetrahedral dyadic prism (Norman W. Johnson) 
 Tuttip (Jonathan Bowers: for truncated-tetrahedral prism) 
 Truncated tetrahedral hyperprism

External links 
 
 

4-polytopes